The Storvreta Innebandyklubb or Storvreta IBK, is a floorball club based in Storvreta, Sweden. The men's team plays in Sweden's highest floorball league, the Swedish Super League (SSL). They won the Swedish national championship in 2010, 2011, 2012, 2016, 2018 and 2019.

Roster
As of August 26, 2020

References

External links
Official website
Storvreta IBK – innebandy.se

Sports teams in Sweden
Swedish floorball teams
1989 establishments in Sweden
Sports clubs established in 1989